Georgios Georgiadis (born 20 May 1948, in Thessaloniki) is a Greek former hammer thrower who competed in the 1972 Summer Olympics.

He was also the champion at the 1971 Mediterranean Games.

References

1948 births
Living people
Greek male hammer throwers
Olympic athletes of Greece
Athletes (track and field) at the 1972 Summer Olympics
Athletes from Thessaloniki
Mediterranean Games gold medalists for Greece
Mediterranean Games medalists in athletics
Athletes (track and field) at the 1971 Mediterranean Games